The 2015–16 Buffalo Bulls men's basketball team represented the University at Buffalo during the 2015–16 NCAA Division I men's basketball season. The Bulls, led by first year head coach Nate Oats, played their home games at Alumni Arena as members of the East Division of the Mid-American Conference. They finished the season 20–15, 10–8 in MAC play to finish in a tie for third place in the East Division and third place overall. They defeated Miami (OH), Ohio, and Akron to be champions of the MAC tournament and earn the conference's automatic bid to the NCAA tournament. In their second consecutive trip to the NCAA Tournament, they lost to Miami (FL) in the first round.

Previous season
The Bulls finished the 2014–15 season 23–10, 12–6 in MAC play to be co–champions of the East Division and co–champions of the MAC overall regular season. They defeated Akron and Central Michigan to become champions of the MAC tournament. They received an automatic bid to the NCAA tournament, their first NCAA Tournament bid in school history, where they lost in the second round to West Virginia.

Departures

Incoming Transfers

Recruiting class of 2015

Recruiting class of 2016

Roster

Schedule
Source: 

|-
!colspan=9 style="background:#041A9B; color:white;"|  Exhibition

|-
!colspan=9 style="background:#041A9B; color:white;"| Non-conference regular season

|-
!colspan=9 style="background:#041A9B; color:white;"| MAC regular season

|-
!colspan=9 style="background:#041A9B; color:white;"| MAC Tournament

|-
!colspan=9 style="background:#041A9B; color:white;"| NCAA tournament

References

Buffalo
Buffalo Bulls men's basketball seasons
Buffalo
Buffalo Bulls
Buffalo Bulls